William C. Davis (born September 1, 1939) is a former politician in Ontario, Canada. He was a Progressive Conservative member of the Legislative Assembly of Ontario from 1985 to 1987 who represented the riding of Scarborough Centre.

Background
Davis was born in Toronto, Ontario, and educated at York University and the Montreal Diocesan Theological College. He became an Anglican priest, and was chair of the Scarborough Board of Education.

Politics
He was elected to the Ontario legislature in the 1985 provincial election, defeating Liberal candidate Gerald Lennon by 359 votes in Scarborough Centre.  The Progressive Conservatives won a narrow plurality of seats in this election, and Davis briefly served as a backbench supporter of Frank Miller's administration before the PCs were defeated in the house. He served for two years as a member of the opposition, and was his party's critic for Education and Community and Social Services. He finished third against Liberal Cindy Nicholas in the 1987 election.

References

Notes

Citations

External links
 

1939 births
Canadian Anglicans
Living people
Politicians from Toronto
Progressive Conservative Party of Ontario MPPs